Henry's Cat is a British animated children's television series, created by Stan Hayward and directed by Bob Godfrey, who was also the producer of Roobarb and Noah and Nelly in... SkylArk. The show starring a yellow feline, known only as Henry's Cat, and his many friends and enemies. In every episode, narration and character voices were provided by Bob Godfrey.

Henry's Cat was first screened by BBC Television in the United Kingdom on September 12, 1983, and aired for 5 series and 51 episodes. The show was re-dubbed for American audiences with the voice of Dom DeLuise.

Characters

Main

Henry's Cat – laid-back, a daydreamer, with a great passion for eating.
Chris Rabbit – Henry's Cat's best friend, an ever-enthusiastic, highly energetic blue rabbit. 
Mosey Mouse – the opposite of Chris Rabbit, Mosey is dour and realistic.
Douglas Dog, Sammy Snail, Pansy Pig, Denise Duck, Ted Tortoise, Philippe Frog – miscellaneous friends of Henry's Cat. They all mean well, but often overestimate their own abilities in various ways.

Antagonists

Farmer Giles – a (human) farmer with a West Country accent, frequently inconvenienced by Henry's Cat's adventures.
Constable Bulldog – a stern policeman (or police dog) who takes a very dim view of the gang's well-meaning escapades. Unlike the others, he is more of an authority figure than a true enemy, and when not getting caught up, is very friendly with the gang.
Rum Baa Baa – a criminal mastermind, Henry's Cat's archenemy, and the world's most evil sheep.

Henry

Henry himself never appeared on screen; the name is thought by some to be an allusion to an earlier one-off Hayward/Godfrey collaboration, Henry 9 'til 5, about a bowler-hatted commuter who escaped his boring everyday life by indulging in daydreams, mostly of a sexual nature. Henry's Cat shared the earlier character's tendency toward wild flights of fancy and laid-back approach to life. Henry's Cat creator Stan Hayward included the official explanation for the character's lack of a name on the official Henry's Cat Special Edition DVD in 2000. The explanation was that Henry, an unseen character in the series, had been Henry's Cat's original owner. He had moved away, and Henry's Cat had forgotten to go with him. He had a terrible memory, and later even forgot his own name, and so became known simply as "Henry's Cat".

Episode list

Series 1 (1983)
Each episode in this series is 4-5 minutes long.

Series 2 (1984)
Each episode in this series is 4–5 minutes long.

Series 3 (1986)
Each episode in this series is 14–15 minutes long.

Series 4 (1986-87)
Each episode in this series is 14–15 minutes long.

Series 5 (1992-93)
Each episode in this series is 12 minutes long.

Notes
For some reason, all of the Henry's Cat episodes from Series 1 are dated 1983 and from Series 2 to Series 5 are dated 1984 in the credits.
Bob Godfrey Films' opening logo of this series was Henry's Cat meowing, in a direct parody of the MGM logo.
The companies that released the videos were Guild Home Video, Castle Vision/Playbox Video, Children's Choice, and Screen Legends/Pickwick Video. Despite airing on Children's BBC, it was never licensed to home video by BBC Video. Family Home Entertainment and HBO Video also had released VHS tapes in the US in 1984 and 1987 respectively.
In January 2008, a promotional DVD containing all Series 1 episodes was distributed by The Times newspaper.

Credits

Series 1

Created by: Stan Hayward
Script: Stan Hayward
Animation: Bob Godfrey, Paul Stone, Kevin Baldwin
Music & Sound: Peter Shade
Narrated by: Bob Godfrey
Camera & Editing: Derek Phillips
Production: Mike Hayes
Produced & Directed by: Bob Godfrey

(c) Stan Hayward Bob Godfrey Films Ltd. 1983

Series 2

Created by: Stan Hayward
Script: Stan Hayward
Animation: Kevin Baldwin, Bob Godfrey, Malcolm Hartley, Drew Mandigo, Paul Stone
Assistant Animator: Malou Bonicos, one episode, series 2, The Hot Day  
Music: John Hyde / de Wolfe Ltd.
Dubbing: John Wood Studios
Editing: Sean Lenihan
Camera: Derek Phillips
Production: Mike Hayes
Produced, Directed and Narrated by: Bob Godfrey

(c) Stan Hayward Bob Godfrey Films Ltd. 1984 (From Series 2 to Series 5)

Series 3

Created by: Stan Hayward
Script: Stan Hayward
Animation: Kevin Baldwin, Bob Godfrey, Malcolm Hartley, Mark Oz, Paul Rosevear
Music: John Hyde / de Wolfe Ltd
Trace & Paint: Tancy Baran, Beryl Godfrey, Louise Unwin
Camera: Derek Phillips
Editing: John Daniels
Production: Mike Hayes
Produced, Directed and Narrated by: Bob Godfrey

Series 4

Created by: Stan Hayward
Script: Stan Hayward
Animation: Kevin Baldwin, Bob Godfrey, Neil Salmon
Additional Animation: Steve Roberts
Music: Jonathan Hodge
Trace and Paint: Beryl Godfrey, Louise Unwin
Camera: Julian Holdaway, Heather Reader
Editing: Picture Head
Production: Mike Hayes
Narrated, Directed and Produced by: Bob Godfrey

Series 5

Created by: Stan Hayward
Script: Stan Hayward, Mike Knowles, Kevin Baldwin, Bob Godfrey
Storyboard, Layouts, Animation: Kevin Baldwin
Additional Animation: Jeff Goldner, Neil Salmon, Bob Godfrey, Jody Gannon.
Trace and Paint: Denise Hambry, Lisa Smith, Jazvinda Phull, Beryl Godfrey, Ricky Arnold
Music: Rowland Lee
Title Music: Jonathan P. Hodge
Camera: Jeremy Moorshead
Backgrounds: Bob Godfrey
Editing: Picturehead
Production: Mike Hayes
Narrated, Produced and Directed by: Bob Godfrey

Home media

Australian VHS releases
 Roadshow Entertainment (2001)

References

External links

The Henry's Cat Page
Toonhound: Henry's Cat

1980s British animated television series
1980s British children's television series
1990s British animated television series
1990s British children's television series
1983 British television series debuts
1993 British television series endings
British children's animated comedy television series
BAFTA winners (television series)
English-language television shows
BBC children's television shows
Animated television series about cats